Princess Mechtilde Lichnowsky, originally Mechtilde Christiane Marie Gräfin von und zu Arco-Zinneberg, later Mechtilde Peto (8 March 1879, in Schloss Schönburg, Pocking now in the Kreis Passau – 4 June 1958, in London) was a German author, married to Karl Max, Fürst von Lichnowsky, 6th Prince and 8th Count Lichnowsky (1860–1928) who succeeded his father in 1901, and served as Imperial German Ambassador to the Court of St. James's, 1912–1914. In 1937 she married Ralph Harding Peto, grandson of Sir Samuel Morton Peto, 1st Baronet.

She was originally from the House of Von Arco-Zinneberg, a branch of the Tyrolese House of Arco.

Relationship 
Mechtilde Lichnowsky had two sisters; Helene married the sculptor, Count Hans Albrecht von Harrach in 1899 and Anna married the colonel and resistance fighter Count Rudolf von Marogna-Redwitz , who was sentenced to death by the People's Court on 12 October 1944 and executed in Plötzensee.

Name in different phases of life 

 1879–1904 Mechtilde Christiane Marie Countess von und zu Arco-Zinneberg
 1904–1937 Mechtilde Christiane Marie Princess Lichnowsky von Woschütz
 1937–1958 Mechtilde Christiane Marie Peto

Works  

 Gods, kings and animals in Egypt , Leipzig: Rowohlt 1913, 255 p.
 A Game of Death , Leipzig 1915.
 God prays , Leipzig 1918.
 The child friend , Berlin 1919.
 Birth. Love, madness, solitary confinement , Berlin: Riess 1921, 533 p.
 The fight with the expert , Vienna / Leipzig: Jahoda & Siegel 1924, 308 p.
 Half & Half , Vienna 1927.
 The rendezvous at the zoo (Querelles d'amoureux) , Vienna / Leipzig: Jahoda & Siegel 1928, 71 p.
 On a leash. Roman , Berlin: S. Fischer Verlag 1930, 320 p.
 Childhood , Berlin 1934.
 Deläide , Berlin 1935.
 The pink house , Hamburg 1936.
 The run of the Asdur , Vienna 1936.
 Talks in Sybaris. Tragedy of a city in 21 dialogues , Vienna 1946.
 Words about words , Vienna: Bergland 1949, 320 p.
 Ordered to look , Esslingen 1953.
 Today and the day before yesterday , Vienna 1958.

letters

 Mechtilde Lichnowsky and Karl Kraus: Venerable Princess! Letters and documents. 1916-1958 , ed. by F. Pfäfflin, E. Dambacher u. a., Göttingen 2005

Literature 

 Annette Antoine: Mechtilde Lichnowsky . In: Britta Jürgs (ed.): Like a Nile bride, who throws you into the waves. Portraits of expressionist artists and writers. AvivA publishing house, Berlin, 2002, P. 230-249
 Anne Martina Emonts: Mechtilde Lichnowsky - Language Desire and Language Criticism . Königshausen & Neumann, Würzburg 2009, 
 Holger Fliessbach:  Lichnowsky, Mechtilde, born Countess of Arco-Zinneberg. In: New German Biography (NDB). Vol. 14, Duncker & Humblot, Berlin 1985, p. 445 ( digitized ).
 Michaela Karl: Mechthild Lichnowsky: The clever princess. In: Bavarian Amazons - 12 portraits. Pustet, Regensburg 2004, p. 50-65
 Armin Strohmeyer: Lost Generation - Thirty forgotten poets of the other Germany. Atrium, Zurich 2008,

References

External links
 

1879 births
1958 deaths
19th-century German people
20th-century German people
20th-century German women
German art collectors
German expatriates in the United Kingdom
German women writers
House of Arco
Mechtilde
People from Passau (district)
People from the Kingdom of Bavaria
Women art collectors
Writers from London